George Coke Dromgoole (May 15, 1797 – April 27, 1847) was a nineteenth-century politician and lawyer from Virginia. He was the uncle of Alexander Dromgoole Sims and the son of Irish-born pioneer Methodist circuit rider Edward Dromgoole.

Biography
Born in Lawrenceville, Virginia, Dromgoole completed preparatory studies, studied law and was admitted to the bar. He was a member of the Virginia House of Delegates from 1823 to 1826, a member of the Virginia Senate from 1826 to 1835 and was a delegate to the Virginia Constitutional Convention in 1829. Dromgoole was elected a Jacksonian and Democrat to the United States House of Representatives in 1834, serving from 1835 to 1841, declining reelection in 1840. He was later elected back in 1842, serving again from 1843 until his death on April 27, 1847, at his estate in Brunswick County, Virginia. He was interred in the family cemetery south of the Meherrin River. Dromgoole also has a cenotaph at Congressional Cemetery in Washington, D.C.

Elections

1835; Dromgoole was elected to the U.S. House of Representatives with 55.65% of the vote, defeating Whig James H. Gholson.
1837; Dromgoole was re-elected unopposed,
1839; Dromgoole was re-elected with 57.12% of the vote, defeating Whig James H. Gholson.
1843; Dromgoole was re-elected with 87.72% of the vote, defeating Whig William Robertson.
1845; Dromgoole was re-elected with 56.97% of the vote, defeating Whig George W. Bolling.
1847; Dromgoole was re-elected with 50.24% of the vote, defeating Whig George W. Bolling.

See also
List of United States Congress members who died in office (1790–1899)

References

External links

1797 births
1847 deaths
Democratic Party members of the Virginia House of Delegates
Democratic Party Virginia state senators
Virginia lawyers
Democratic Party members of the United States House of Representatives from Virginia
People from Lawrenceville, Virginia
Jacksonian members of the United States House of Representatives from Virginia
19th-century American politicians
19th-century American lawyers
Burials in Virginia